This is a partial list of molecules that contain 18 carbon atoms.

See also
 Carbon number
 List of compounds with carbon number 17
 List of compounds with carbon number 19

C18